Finland competed at the 1964 Summer Olympics in Tokyo, Japan. 89 competitors, 84 men and 5 women, took part in 64 events in 13 sports.

Medalists

Gold
 Pauli Nevala — Athletics, Men's Javelin Throw
 Pentti Linnosvuo — Shooting, Rapid-Fire Pistol (Mixed)
 Väinö Markkanen — Shooting, Free Pistol (Mixed)

Bronze
 Pertti Purhonen — Boxing, Men's Welterweight
 Hannu Rantakari — Gymnastics, Men's Long Horse Vault

Athletics

Basketball

Roster
Jorma Pilkevaara
Juha Harjula
Kari Liimo
Kauko Kauppinen
Martti Liimo
Pertti Laanti
Raimo Lindholm
Raimo Vartia
Risto Kala
Teijo Finneman
Timo Lampén
Uolevi Manninen

Boxing

Canoeing

Diving

Gymnastics

Modern pentathlon

Three male pentathletes represented Finland in 1964.

Individual
 Keijo Vanhala
 Kari Kaaja
 Jorma Hotanen

Team
 Keijo Vanhala
 Kari Kaaja
 Jorma Hotanen

Rowing

Sailing

Shooting

Eight shooters represented Finland in 1964. Pentti Linnosvuo won gold in the 25 pistol and Väinö Markkanen won gold in the 50 pistol.

25 m pistol
 Pentti Linnosvuo
 Kalle Sievänen

50 m pistol
 Väinö Markkanen
 Immo Huhtinen

300 m rifle, three positions
 Esa Kervinen
 Antti Rissanen

50 m rifle, three positions
 Vilho Ylönen
 Esa Kervinen

50 m rifle, prone
 Antti Koskinen
 Vilho Ylönen

Swimming

Weightlifting

Wrestling

References

External links
Official Olympic Reports
International Olympic Committee results database

Nations at the 1964 Summer Olympics
1964
1964 in Finnish sport